Zelenodolsky (masculine), Zelenodolskaya (feminine), or Zelenodolskoye (neuter) may refer to:

Zelenodolsky District, a district of the Republic of Tatarstan, Russia
Zelenodolskoye, a rural locality (a selo) in Primorsky Krai, Russia

See also
Zelenodolsk (disambiguation)